Spavius is a genus of beetle belonging to the family Cryptophagidae.

The species of this genus are found in Europe.

Species:
 Spavius glaber (Gyllenhal, 1808)

References

Cryptophagidae